Kanalski Lom is a village in the hills south of Most na Soči in the Municipality of Tolmin in the Littoral region of Slovenia.

The parish church in the settlement is dedicated to Saints Primus and Felician and belongs to the Koper Diocese.

References

External links 
Kanalski Lom on Geopedia

Populated places in the Municipality of Tolmin